Whitethorn Creek is a  long 4th order tributary to the Banister River in Pittsylvania County, Virginia.  The Whitehorn Creek watershed and its tributary, Mill Creek, are the location of one of the largest uranium deposits in the United States on Cole Hill.

Variant names
According to the Geographic Names Information System, it has also been known historically as:
 Whitehorn Creek

Course 
Whitethorn Creek rises about 0.5 miles south-southeast of Pickerel, Virginia and then flows southeast to join the Banister River at Markham.

Watershed 
Whitethorn Creek drains  of area, receives about 45.5 in/year of precipitation, has a wetness index of 432.34, and is about 46% forested.

See also 
 List of Virginia Rivers

External Links 
 Water Quality Data from USGS

References 

Rivers of Virginia
Rivers of Pittsylvania County, Virginia
Tributaries of the Roanoke River